Vera Kolodzig (born 22 April 1985 in Lisbon) is a Portuguese actress of German descent.

Life and career
Kolodzig, whose father is German, lived in Cascais until she was 18 and then went to London to study contemporary theatre at the University of Essex. She started her career early, doing commercials at the age of 6. She performed in a number of theatre productions, most recently (2011/12) in Os 39 Degraus, an adaption of Hitchcock's The 39 Steps. She is most known for starring in several Portuguese telenovelas.

Television work
2000/2001: Jardins Proibidos (as Teresa Santos)
2001/2002: Filha do Mar (as Diana Nogueira)
2005/2006: Dei-te Quase Tudo (as Joana Capelo)
2007: Ilha dos Amores (as Beatriz Machado da Câmara)
2007/2008: Fascínios (as Renata Miranda)
2009/2010: Deixa Que Te Leve (as Filipa Calçada)
2010/2011: Espírito Indomável (as Maria José (Zé) Gomes/Constança Monteiro Castro)
2012/2013: Doida Por Ti (as Bianca Pessoa)
2014/2015: Jardins Proibidos (2014) (as Teresa Ávila)

External links

References

1985 births
Living people
People from Cascais
Portuguese television actresses
Alumni of the University of Essex
Portuguese people of German descent
Portuguese people of Polish descent